Made of Rain is the eighth studio album from English rock band The Psychedelic Furs. Released via Cooking Vinyl on 31 July 2020, it is the first studio album from the band in almost 30years and has received positive reviews.

Recording and release
When the band reunited in 2000, they had intended on recording new material but principal songwriter Richard Butler did not feel confident in any newly written songs until six months before prior to the sessions for Made of Rain. It is the first studio release by the group since 1991's World Outside and was preceded by lead single "Don't Believe" on 31 January 2020. The album was initially scheduled to be released on 1 May, but was delayed until 31 July due to logistical issues stemming from the COVID-19 pandemic. The album is the band's first with members Rich Good (formerly of The Pleased, who joined in 2009) and Amanda Kramer (formerly of Information Society, who joined in 2002).

Critical reception

 Album of the Year sums up critical consensus as a 77 out of 100, with 12 reviewers and AnyDecentMusic? rates it 7.2 out of 10 with eight critics.

Hal Horowitz of American Songwriter gave the release 3.5 out of five stars and called it "long overdue", with some repetition and an over-long runtime but several songs that highlight Richard Butler's talents as a performer and songwriter. In The Arts Desk, Guy Oddy's three-out-of-five-star review looks forward to hearing the songs performed live to hear new music "which displays the band’s distinctive swagger". Consequence of Sound's Jordan Blum had a B+ review, praising several technical aspects but also criticizing the sequencing and sameness of several songs.

In The Independent, Elissa Bray gave Made of Rain three out of five stars and called this "a welcome return to the Furs’ classic blend of aggression, tender melody and brooding ambience" that is darker than previous material. MusicOMH's Ross Horton compared the work to artist as diverse as Phil Spector and U2 circa The Joshua Tree, summing up "At this stage in their careers, with nothing left to prove, The Psychedelic Furs needn’t have made anything this good"; his review is four out of five stars. John Bergstrom of PopMatters had a mixed six out of 10 stars, with praise for "The Boy That Invented Rock and Roll" in particular but criticism of all other tracks as being "an anticlimax".

The review from Tim Sendra at AllMusic was also reserved in its praise, stating "It may not be Talk Talk Talk, Pt. 2 or Forever Now again, but it proves the Furs still have plenty of life left in them, and it's always nice to hear Richard Butler's voice no matter what the setting."

Track listing

Personnel
The Psychedelic Furs
Richard Butler – vocals, production
Tim Butler – bass guitar, production
Paul Garisto – drums, production
Rich Good – guitar, production
Amanda Kramer – keyboards, production
Mars Williams – saxophone, production

Additional musicians
Richard Fortus
BT
Jon Carin
Joe McGinty
Paisley Fortus
Clover Fortus

Technical personnel
Richard Fortus – production
David Maurice – production
Tim Palmer – mixing
Jason McEntire – engineering

Charts

References

External links

The Psychedelic Furs albums
2020 albums
Albums produced by Richard Fortus
Albums postponed due to the COVID-19 pandemic